Melica dendroides is a grass species in the family Poaceae that is endemic to southern part of Africa.

Description
The species is perennial and is caespitose as well. The surface of a leaf-blade is scabrous while the membrane is eciliated. The main panicle branches are indistinct and almost racemose.

Spikelets are cuneate and are solitary. They have fertile spikelets that are pediceled. It is also 7-9 veined while the surface of the lemma is villous with ciliated margins. Both the upper and lower glumes are elliptic, keelless, membranous, and are purple in colour. It palea is 2-veined.

Flowers are fleshy, oblong, truncate, have 2 lodicules and grow together. They have 3 anthers with fruits that are caryopsis. The fruit is also have additional pericarp with a linear hilum.

References

dendriodes
Flora of Africa